Actor-Based Concurrent Language (ABCL) is a family of programming languages, developed in Japan in the 1980s and 1990s.

ABCL/1
ABCL/1 (Actor-Based Concurrent Language) is a prototype-based concurrent programming language for the ABCL MIMD system, created in 1986 by Akinori Yonezawa, of the Department of Information Science at the University of Tokyo.

ABCL/1 uses asynchronous message passing among objects to achieve concurrency. It requires Common Lisp. Implementations in Kyoto Common Lisp (KCL) and Symbolics Lisp are available from the author.

ABCL/c+
An implementation of ABCL/c+ is available from the ACM.

ABCL/R
ABCL/R is an object-oriented reflective subset of ABCL/1, written by Professor Akinori Yonezawa of Tokyo Institute of Technology in 1988.

ABCL/R2
ABCL/R2 is a second generation version of ABCL/R, designed for the Hybrid Group Architecture. It was produced at the Tokyo Institute of Technology in 1992, and has almost all the functionality of ABCL/1. It is written in Common Lisp. As a reflective language, its programs can dynamically control their behavior, including scheduling policy, from within a user-process context.

Further reading
ABCL: An Object-Oriented Concurrent System, A. Yonezawa ed, MIT Press 1990
Reflection in an Object-Oriented Concurrent Language, T. Watanabe et al., SIGPLAN Notices 23(11):306-315 (Nov 1988)
An Implementation of An Operating System Kernel using Concurrent Object Oriented Language ABCL/c+, N. Doi et al. in ECOOP '88, S. Gjessing et al. eds, LNCS 322, Springer 1988

References

External links
 

Prototype-based programming languages
Concurrent programming languages
Common Lisp (programming language) software